Reverend Patrick McCollum (born April 11, 1950) is an interfaith chaplain, spiritual mentor, and peace counselor.

Early life 
Before moving into international peace work, McCollum was a jeweler and designer, with his work being sold by retailers such as Fred Segal, Henry Bendels, Billy Martins, the Forum shops at Caesars Palace, Boogies Diner, and Barney’s of New York. Some of his works have been commissioned by the British Royal Family and the White House.

Ministerial Work 
H.E. Rev. Patrick McCollum was ordained in 1971 and has served as president of Our Lady of the Wells Church, a California Non-Profit Religious Corporation.  He is a member of the Advisory Committee of the Peace Service Center in Katmandu, Nepal, and has sat on the National Advisory Council of American’s United for the Separation of Church and State for nearly two decades. In 2008, Reverend McCollum served as an Advisor to the United States Commission on Civil Rights on a special report to Congress and the President of the United States, outlining problems and solutions to religious discrimination in U.S. prisons.

In 2002 McCollum became the executive director of the National Correctional Chaplaincy Directors Association, and since 2004 also serves as the chaplaincy liaison for the American Academy of Religion.

He has served as the National Prison Chaplaincy Affairs Coordinator for the Lady Liberty League since 2001, and has served as the International Interfaith Ambassador for Circle Sanctuary since 2010.
 
From 2005–2013 McCollum served as director of chaplaincy for Cherry Hill Seminary. He has also served as co-founder and co-facilitator of the G-Card program for the American Academy of Religion. McCollum served on the Executive Council of the American Correctional Chaplains Association, and as the Minority Faith Issues chair.

On February 5, 2008, Rev. McCollum testified before the U.S Commission on Civil Rights, and his remarks were widely quoted in the Commission's report entitled "Enforcing Religious Freedom in Prison".

Parliament of the World’s Religions
McCollum met and befriended Jane Goodall, the protector of the gorilla population in Gombi, Africa at the 2004 Parliament of the World’s Religions in Barcelona. Together they formed an alliance for ecological peace that now includes Goodall, H. H. Puja Swami Chidanand Saraswati, Vandana Shiva, and H. H. Amrta Suryananda Maha Rája.

World Forum of Spiritual Culture
In 2010 Rev. Patrick McCollum attended the first World Forum of Spiritual Culture in Astana, Kazakhstan. The event drew spiritual luminaries from across the world. During the Forum, McCollum addressed the Kazakhstan Parliament on the subject of "World Peace and Creating a New Narrative for Humanity.

Awakened World 2012
McCollum was invited by the Board of Directors for the Association for Global New Thought (AGENT) to join the Dalai Lama’s International Peace Council and the Association for Global New Thought as a core group leader to help facilitate a world event in Rome, Italy, called Awakened World 2012. The event was attended by many political, religious and human rights leaders in the world.

Children of the Earth
On October 14, 2015, Rev. Patrick McCollum was elected as vice president of Children of the Earth (COE), a United Nations Non-Governmental Organization (NGO) founded in 2001 by its president, Nina Meyerhof. COE is a non-profit organization that "educates and mentors youth leaders around the world by inspiring and uniting them, through personal and social transformation, to create a peaceful and sustainable world."

Awards
McCollum received the Mahatma Gandhi Award at the Capitol Building in Washington D.C. in 2010 for the advancement of religious pluralism, and the Ralph Bunche International Peace Award in March 2016 during the UN Conference on the Status of Women.

On February 1, 2020, Dr. Jane Goodall, nominated Patrick McCollum for the position of Messenger of Peace for the United Nations. 2020 marks the 50th year of McCollum’s public commitment to working for world peace and planetary sustainability.

In a Facebook video, Dr. Jane Goodall said, “I nominate him [Patrick McCollum] now for UN Messenger of Peace. He has done so much for peace on this planet. For these past fifty years, he has been standing up for indigenous rights and for the rights of women and for the rights of different religions to be heard; for understanding between people of different races. And, in fact, there’s very few social issues that he hasn’t been involved in.”

References

Bibliography
Courting The Lady, A Wiccan Journey, Book One: The Sacred Path (Our Lady of the Wells Press, 2006).

1950 births
American chaplains
American Wiccans
Wiccan priests
Living people
American non-fiction writers
Prison chaplains